Alexander Gilbert (born July 3, 1957) is an American former professional basketball player and coach. He is a 6 ft 7 ½ in (2.02 m) tall power forward-center.

College career
Gilbert played college basketball at Indiana State University, with the Sycamores, from 1978 to 1980.  A two-year starter, he was a critical to the Sycamores compiling a to a 2-year record of 79–55 (.754), a MVC title, a MVC Tourney title and an NCAA National Finals finish.  A phenomenal athlete, Gilbert broke up a tight game Virginia Tech in the First Round of the NCAA Tournament, Gilbert's "hook dunk" off a rebound, shook the Sycamores of their lethargy and spurred them to a 17-point victory over the Hokies.
 
Prior to his Indiana State career; Gilbert spent two seasons at Coffeyville Community College;  leading the Red Ravens in scoring and rebounding, (16.7 and 11.2 respectively) – he was tapped for the KJCCC All-Conference team and named All-American (Honorable Mention).  He scored 1,605 points while at Coffeyville and was named to the Red Raven Hall of Fame.

Following the 1977–78 season, he signed an NCAA Division I letter of intent, spurning Missouri and Norm Stewart.
He totaled 632 points, 447 rebounds, 28 assists, 22 steals, 60 starts in 61 games; his 75 blocks place him 9th on the career list.

Professional career
After being drafted in the 1980 NBA draft, Gilbert played on different Milwaukee Bucks Summer League teams but was cut during training camp. In December 1980, Gilbert signed with Grindavík of the Icelandic second-tier 1. deild karla. In August 1982, he was signed as a player-coach for reigning Icelandic champions Njarðvík of the Úrvalsdeild karla. He was released by Njarðvík in November after appearing in 6 games where he averaged 24.0 points per game. His best performance came in his last game where he scored 42 points against Fram. Following his professional career, Gilbert returned to the United States and began a career in the Corrections industry, eventually moving into Counseling.

In recent years, Gilbert has joined current athletes in the battle for "Likeness & Image" control and reimbursement; he is a co-signee of a landmark legal case versus the NCAA.

References

External links
Draftexpress.com Profile
Basketball RealGM
GoSycamores Bio
Coffeyville Hall of Fame
College Basketball Stats
International Basketball Stats
Úrvalsdeild statistics at Icelandic Basketball Association

1957 births
Living people
Indiana State Sycamores men's basketball players
Sportspeople from Terre Haute, Indiana
American expatriate basketball people in Iceland
American men's basketball players
Basketball players from Illinois
Centers (basketball)
Grindavík men's basketball players
Power forwards (basketball)
Njarðvík men's basketball coaches
Njarðvík men's basketball players
Úrvalsdeild karla (basketball) coaches
Úrvalsdeild karla (basketball) players